Tammy Lyn Homolka (January 1, 1975 – December 24, 1990) was a Canadian murder victim who was killed by her older sister Karla Homolka and Karla's partner Paul Bernardo. On Christmas Eve  1990, shortly before what would have been Tammy's 16th birthday on New Years Day (January 1, 1991), Karla and Bernardo plied Tammy with alcoholic drinks laced with the sedative Halcion. When she became unconscious, the two raped her. Tammy became sick while sedated and died. After failed attempts to revive her, Karla covered up evidence of the assault and called an ambulance. Her official cause of death was listed as choking to death on her own vomit, and was believed at the time to have been an accident. After the killers were arrested for the murders of Leslie Mahaffy and Kristen French, Tammy Homolka's body was exhumed. She is interred at Victoria Lawn Cemetery in St. Catharines, Ontario.

Biography

Tammy Homolka grew up in the neighbourhood of Port Credit. She was known for her athletic abilities and she avidly participated in a variety of sports, including track and field, cross country running, and soccer, with soccer being her favourite. She was a grade 10 student at Sir Winston Churchill Secondary School in St. Catharines at the time of her death.

Bernardo's involvement

From the beginning of their relationship, Karla noticed that Bernardo had taken a particular liking to Tammy. He would often pay special attention to her, and even went so far as to have his girlfriend pretend to be her sister during sex. In September 1990, Karla agreed to allow Paul to have sex with Tammy. She obtained a bottle of Halothane (a liquid general anesthetic) from the veterinary clinic where she worked, which would later be used to sedate Tammy while the two raped her. On December 24, 1990, Tammy was drugged with a combination of Halcion and alcohol, passing out in the family room in the basement of the Homolka house. Tammy's parents and sister Lori were upstairs asleep at the time. They filmed the entire rape, taking turns holding the camera while using the Halothane to keep Tammy unconscious.

Three weeks after Tammy Homolka's death, Karla and Bernardo filmed a video called "The Fireside Chat" within the Homolka residence. The video was eventually viewed as court evidence. It started in the basement recreation room and at some point the filming moved into Tammy's bedroom. While they were in the recreation room, Karla admitted to Bernardo that she enjoyed Bernardo's rape of Tammy. She also said in the video that she would like to leave a rose at Tammy's grave site. When they were in Tammy's bedroom, Karla dressed up in Tammy's clothing as well as acting like her sister. They had sex on Tammy's bed.

In 2001, the magazine Elm Street published an article in which it implied that forensic evidence proved that Tammy's death was not an accident and that her sister had deliberately administered an overdose of Halothane. The magazine described Karla as a "malignant narcissist" who was so incensed by her fiancé's attraction to her sister that she took steps to remove Tammy from his affections permanently.

Implications of Karla Homolka's plea bargain
On February 26, 1993, the defence lawyer and the Crown began negotiations on a 10-year sentence for Karla in exchange for her testimony and full disclosure of all crimes. At the time of the negotiations, the role she and Bernardo had played in Tammy's death was not known. When she was admitted for psychiatric assessment in March 1993, Karla confessed in a letter to her parents about her involvement in Tammy's death. When the plea agreement was finalized, the initial 10-year sentence was still intact, with two years added for Tammy's death. Karla was officially sentenced to 12 years on July 6, 1993.

On July 20, 1993, Tammy's body was exhumed. Inside her casket was a wedding invitation for Karla and Bernardo's wedding, as well as some notes. Other members of the Homolka family asked that the items be removed before Tammy's re-interment.

Books
 Invisible Darkness by Stephen Williams
 Deadly Innocence by Scott Burnside

Movie

In 2006, the American film Karla premiered. It was told from Karla Homolka's point of view. In the film, Tammy Homolka's death is featured in one of the scenes. Laura Prepon portrayed Karla, Misha Collins portrayed Paul Bernardo, and Cherilyn Hayres portrayed Tammy Homolka.

References

Other sources
 

Child abduction in Canada
Murder in Canada
1990 in Ontario
1990 murders in Canada
Incidents of violence against girls
Sororicides